Márcio Henrique Maia Passos (born 25 April 1985) is a Brazilian footballer played for Manaus. He is able to play as defensive midfielder and left back.

On 28 December 2014, Márcio Passos signed a contract with Sepahan.

Club career
 Last Update: 28 December 2014

Honours
América de Natal
 Campeonato Potiguar: 2012, 2014

Sepahan
 Iran Pro League: 2014–15

ABC
 Copa RN: 2016, 2017
 Campeonato Potiguar: 2016, 2017

Manaus
 Campeonato Amazonense: 2019

References

1985 births
Living people
People from Manaus
Brazilian footballers
Brazilian expatriate footballers
Expatriate footballers in Iran
Brazilian expatriate sportspeople in Iran
Campeonato Brasileiro Série B players
Campeonato Brasileiro Série C players
Persian Gulf Pro League players
Nacional Futebol Clube players
Associação Desportiva Cabofriense players
Esporte Clube Tigres do Brasil players
America Football Club (RJ) players
Rio Branco Esporte Clube players
Agremiação Sportiva Arapiraquense players
Oeste Futebol Clube players
América Futebol Clube (RN) players
Sepahan S.C. footballers
ABC Futebol Clube players
Clube de Regatas Brasil players
Esporte Clube Taubaté players
Manaus Futebol Clube players
União Recreativa dos Trabalhadores players
Association football defenders
Sportspeople from Amazonas (Brazilian state)